Non Zero Sumness is the debut album released by Planet Funk, also released a limited edition version of the album called Non Zero Sumness Plus One, containing the bonus track "One Step Closer" sung by Jim Kerr, which is a vocal version of the instrumental "Where Is the Max".

Track 11 has a hidden track, entitled "Rosa Blu", which begins at the 7:05 marker.

Track listing

Personnel

Planet Funk
 Marco Baroni – keyboards, piano, production, engineering, mixing
 Alex Neri – keyboards, drum programming, production
 Sergio Della Monica – bass, guitars, production
 Domenico "GG" Canu – guitars, production

Other personnel
 Auli Kokko – vocals (2)
 Sally Doherty – vocals (3, 6, 11), flute (3)
 Dan Black – vocals (4, 5, 7, 10), guitars (4, 5, 10)
 Raiz – vocals (9)
 Simon Duffy – keyboards, drum programming, engineer, mixing
 Andrea Cozzani – bass (2, 4)
 Hugh Harris – bass (9)
 Michael Thompson – guitars (2)
 Charlie Burchill – guitars (6)
 Simon Hanson – drums

Charts

References

2002 albums
Planet Funk albums